"Prej Inati" is a song recorded by Kosovo-Albanian rapper Ledri Vula released as the second single from his debut studio album, 10/10 (2020). It was solely written by the rapper himself and produced by Frederik Buchard and Jobinho De Souza. The official music video was shot in the United States and was uploaded on 22 February 2020 onto YouTube in order to accompany the single's release. It depicts the rapper walking through the streets of New York, and other scenes of him together with his romantic interest, played by Swedish model Ida Helenius, in both love and fun scenarios intersperse.

Background and composition 

"Prej Inati" has a running time of two minutes and twenty seven seconds and was written by the rapper himself. Its production was helmed by American producers Frederik Buchard and Jobinho De Souza whilst Swedish producer Johan Bejerholm was hired for the record's mastering process. In regard to the musical notation, it was composed in  time performed in the key of D minor in common time with an allegro tempo of 140 beats per minute.

Music video 

Ledri teased the single with a photo and video posted onto his official Instagram account on 15 and 19 February 2020, respectively. The accompanying music video was ultimately premiered to the rapper's YouTube channel on 22 February 2020. After the aforementioned premiere, it was released on digital platforms and to streaming services on 23 February 2020 through Loudcom Media. In the opening scene, the video depicts Ledri walking on the Hudson River promenade and then through the main streets of New York City. It continues in a similar way interspersed with scenes of Ledri in a passionate relationship with a young female played by Swedish model Ida Helenius. Both are depicted as enamored with each other, and enjoying activities such as cycling and strolling through the city.

Charts

Release history

References 

2020 songs
2020 singles
Ledri Vula songs
Albanian-language songs
Songs written by Ledri Vula